Jörg Ahmann (born February 12, 1966 in Grevenbroich) is a beach volleyball player from Germany, who won the bronze medal in the men's beach team competition at the 2000 Summer Olympics in Sydney, Australia, partnering Axel Hager. He also represented his native country at the 1996 Summer Olympics in Atlanta, Georgia.

References

1966 births
Living people
German men's beach volleyball players
German volleyball coaches 
Beach volleyball players at the 1996 Summer Olympics
Beach volleyball players at the 2000 Summer Olympics
Olympic beach volleyball players of Germany
Olympic bronze medalists for Germany
Olympic medalists in beach volleyball
Medalists at the 2000 Summer Olympics